Jerzy the Giant is the second album by The Terrible Twos.

History
After the mild critical praise of the outfit's previous album If You Ever See an Owl..., the group's lead singer Matt Pryor began writing more songs, partly inspired by his daughter Lily, (who contributed several lyrics to many of the songs) as well as his youngest son Jerzy, whom the album is named after. The album was recorded in the summer of 2007 in Pryor's home studio with the other members of The New Amsterdams. The album was recorded in a month at Pryor's home studio, and edited and mixed at the same time Pryor was recording his first-ever solo album Confidence Man.

Track listing

Personnel
Matt Pryor - Vocals, Guitar
Bill Belzer - Drums
Eric McCann - Upright Bass
Dustin Kinsey - Guitar
Zach Holland - Keyboard

References

Matt Pryor (musician) albums
Vagrant Records albums
2008 albums